In enzymology, a phenylalanine(histidine) transaminase is an enzyme that catalyzes the chemical reaction

L-phenylalanine + pyruvate  phenylpyruvate + L-alanine

Thus, the two substrates of this enzyme are L-phenylalanine and pyruvate, whereas its two products are phenylpyruvate and L-alanine.

This enzyme belongs to the family of transferases, specifically the transaminases, which transfer nitrogenous groups.  The systematic name of this enzyme class is L-phenylalanine:pyruvate aminotransferase. Other names in common use include phenylalanine (histidine) aminotransferase, phenylalanine(histidine):pyruvate aminotransferase, histidine:pyruvate aminotransferase, and L-phenylalanine(L-histidine):pyruvate aminotransferase.

References

Further reading 

 

EC 2.6.1
Enzymes of unknown structure